Hussein Halawani (born 6 January 1996) is a Saudi Arabian professional footballer who plays as a left winger or left back for Najran.

Career
Halawani started his career at the youth team of Al-Ittihad. He made his professional debut for Al-Ittihad on 4 May 2017, in the league match against Al-Fateh, replacing Ammar Al-Najar. on 19 January 2018 he joined Al-Batin on loan from Al-Ittihad. On 15 July 2018, he joined Al-Orobah on loan from Al-Ittihad. On 4 February 2019, his loan to Al-Orobah was ended early and Halawani joined Al-Tai on a permanent deal. On 23 July 2019, Halawani joined Ohod on a permanent deal. Despite making no appearances for the club, Halawani left Ohod on 2 September 2019 and joined Najran On 29 July 2020, Halawani joined Al-Ettifaq on a three-year deal. On 7 February 2021, Halawani was loaned out to fellow Pro League side Al-Ain until the end of the season. On 11 August 2021, Halawani joined Al-Wehda. On 30 January 2022, Halawani joined Al-Khaleej. On 3 July 2022, Halawani joined Hajer. On 21 January 2023, Halawani once again joined Najran.

Honours
Al-Khaleej 
First Division: 2021–22

References

External links 
 

1996 births
Living people
Saudi Arabian footballers
Ittihad FC players
Al Batin FC players
Al-Orobah FC players
Al-Tai FC players
Ohod Club players
Najran SC players
Ettifaq FC players
Al-Ain FC (Saudi Arabia) players
Al-Wehda Club (Mecca) players
Khaleej FC players
Hajer FC players
Saudi Professional League players
Saudi First Division League players
Association football wingers
Association football fullbacks